Sarah de Oliveira Nikitin (born December 27, 1988) is a Brazilian competitive archer. A member of Brazil's archery squad in three editions of the Pan American Games (2007, 2011, and 2015), and at the 2016 Summer Olympics, Nikitin scored her only career medal with a bronze over Venezuela's Leidys Brito in the women's individual recurve tournament at the 2014 South American Games in Santiago, Chile. Nikitin currently trains under the tutelage of head coach Evandro Azevedo for the Brazilian national squad, while shooting at a local archery range in her native São Paulo.

Nikitin was selected by the Brazilian Olympic Committee to compete for the host nation's archery squad at the 2016 Summer Olympics in Rio de Janeiro, shooting in both individual and team recurve tournaments. First, Nikitin discharged 609 points, 8 perfect tens, and 3 bull's eyes to take the fiftieth seed heading to the knockout draw from the classification round, along with the trio's cumulative score of 1,845. Sitting at eleventh in the team recurve, Nikitin and her compatriots Ane Marcelle dos Santos and Marina Canetta put up a gallant fight amid the loud applause of their parochial crowd, but bowed out of the opening round match to the Italians in straight sets 0–6. In the women's individual recurve, Nikitin was unable to overthrow North Korea's Kang Un-ju early in the opening round match that abruptly ended her Olympic debut in a severe 0–6 defeat.

References

External links
 Sarah de Oliveira Nikitin at the Brazilian Olympic Committee 
 
 

Brazilian female archers
Living people
Sportspeople from São Paulo
1988 births
Archers at the 2007 Pan American Games
Archers at the 2011 Pan American Games
Archers at the 2015 Pan American Games
Pan American Games competitors for Brazil
Olympic archers of Brazil
Archers at the 2016 Summer Olympics
South American Games gold medalists for Brazil
South American Games silver medalists for Brazil
South American Games bronze medalists for Brazil
South American Games medalists in archery
Competitors at the 2014 South American Games
20th-century Brazilian women
21st-century Brazilian women